The 1976 Dartmouth Big Green football team was an American football team that represented Dartmouth College during the 1976 NCAA Division I football season. The Big Green tied for third place in the Ivy League.

In its sixth season under head coach Jake Crouthamel, the team compiled a 6–3 record and outscored opponents 236 to 111. Kevin Young and Patrick Sullivan were the team captains.

The Big Green's 4–3 conference record tied for third place in the Ivy League standings. Dartmouth outscored Ivy opponents 167 to 91. 

Dartmouth played its home games at Memorial Field on the college campus in Hanover, New Hampshire.

Schedule

References

Dartmouth
Dartmouth Big Green football seasons
Dartmouth Big Green football